Keith Whitehead (9 September 1931 – 9 June 1980) was an Australian water polo player. He competed at the 1956 Summer Olympics and the 1960 Summer Olympics.

References

External links
 

1931 births
1980 deaths
Australian male water polo players
Olympic water polo players of Australia
Water polo players at the 1956 Summer Olympics
Water polo players at the 1960 Summer Olympics
Water polo players from Sydney